John Michael Kohler II (November 3, 1844 – November 5, 1900) was member of the Kohler family of Wisconsin and was a prosperous industrialist and mayor of Sheboygan, Wisconsin. Kohler founded what later became known as the Kohler Company, a large producer of bathroom and kitchen products.

Early life

Kohler was born on November 3, 1844 in the Alpine village of Schnepfau, Austria, the fourth child of dairy farmer John Michael Kohler Sr. (1805–74) and his wife, the former Maria Anna Moosbrugger (1816–53). After his wife's death, the elder Kohler remarried, and he and his large family emigrated to the United States.  With help from a relative, the Kohlers built up a promising dairy business.

After a limited formal education, John Michael Kohler found work in St. Paul, Minnesota. In 1865 he moved to Chicago, Illinois, and became a traveling salesman. In Sheboygan, Wisconsin, 56 miles north of Milwaukee on Lake Michigan, he met Lillie Vollrath (1848–1883), the daughter of local steel and iron industrialist Jacob Vollrath (1824–1898). The couple was married in 1871.

Business career

Shortly after his marriage, Kohler worked at the steel and iron factory his father-in-law partly owned. He took over the company two years later during the Panic of 1873. By the early 1880s, the firm was producing a variety of iron and enamelware products. In 1883, Kohler put ornamental feet on a cast-iron water trough and sold it as a bathtub. Four years later, more than two-thirds of the company's business was in plumbing products and enamelware. In 1888, Kohler and two partners had the firm incorporated.

In 1899, Kohler purchased 21 acres of farmland four miles west of Sheboygan, intending to move his entire company to the location. Shortly after the new factory was constructed, in 1900, Kohler died at 56, likely of heart failure.

Five years later, 30-year-old Walter J. Kohler assumed his father's corporate presidency and began to guide the firm. In 1912, it was officially designated the Kohler Company, and the property surrounding the plant became the Village of Kohler.

Civic leadership
From 1880 until his death Kohler served in several governmental offices. In 1892 he became Mayor of Sheboygan.  Citizens also admired Kohler for his generous contributions and leadership in the areas of art and culture, symbols of Sheboygan's desire to be more than a factory town.

The John Michael Kohler Arts Center, which occupies a square block in downtown Sheboygan (containing Kohler's restored Gilded Age home along with modern buildings), is named for Kohler, as is John Michael Kohler State Park, established on land donated in 1966 by the Kohler family. The main highway into Sheboygan, Kohler Memorial Drive (which is routed as Wisconsin Highway 23), is also named for Kohler.

Personal life

The Kohlers had six children, including Walter Jodok Kohler, Sr. (1875-1940), who would later be Governor of Wisconsin. In 1887, four years after his wife Lillie's death, John  married Lillie's sister, Wilhelmina (Minnie) Vollrath (1852–1929), and they had one child, Herbert Vollrath Kohler Sr (1891–1968). This Kohler was to become the dominant force in the Kohler company for many years, presiding over the longest strike in American history.

The large and fashionable Kohler family home in Sheboygan was filled with music, books, and constant lessons in ethics and public service. The entire Sheboygan area mourned Kohler's 1900 death. John's three daughters remained in the Kohler house, unmarried, for the rest of their lives, frequently wearing black.

References

External links
Brief biography of Jacob J. Vollrath, Kohler's father-in-law

Kohler Company
People from Vorarlberg
Kohler family of Wisconsin
Mayors of Sheboygan, Wisconsin
Businesspeople from Wisconsin
Austrian Empire emigrants to the United States
1844 births
1900 deaths
19th-century American politicians